The black-winged oriole (Oriolus nigripennis) is a species of bird in the family Oriolidae.
It is found in Africa from Sierra Leone and Liberia to southern South Sudan, western Uganda, central Democratic Republic of Congo and north-western Angola.

Its natural habitats are subtropical or tropical moist lowland forests and subtropical or tropical mangrove forests.

Some authorities have considered the mountain oriole to be a subspecies of the black-winged oriole.

References

black-winged oriole
Birds of the Gulf of Guinea
Birds of the African tropical rainforest
black-winged oriole
Taxonomy articles created by Polbot